Ian Humphreys is a British poet. He published his debut collection, Zebra with Nine Arches Press. It was nominated for the Portico Prize.

Biography 
Ian Humphreys was born in Bedfordshire and raised in Cheshire. He lives in West Yorkshire. He has lived in Hong Kong, Sydney, Manchester and London. His mother is from Macau and is of mixed Asian, African and European descent. His father is of Anglo-Irish descent. He has an MA in creative writing from Manchester Writing School.

Writing 
Humphreys is the author of the poetry collection, Zebra (Nine Arches Press, 2019). In 2017, Humphreys was featured in Ten: Poets of the New Generation (Bloodaxe). His poems have been longlisted in the National Poetry Competition and his fiction has been shortlisted three times for the Bridport Prize. Humphreys’ work has been published in The Poetry Review, The Rialto and Magma. He won the Hamish Canham Prize and was highly commended in the Forward Prizes for Poetry.

He was the editor of Why I Write Poetry (Nine Arches Press, 2021) and the producer and co-editor of an anthology on Sylvia Plath (Nine Arches, 2022). He is a guest editor at Butcher's Dog poetry magazine.

Humphreys was mentored on The Complete Works poets of colour mentoring scheme initiated by Bernardine Evaristo to redress representational invisibility. The scheme (2007-2017) was directed by Dr Natalie Teitler, during which time thirty poets were mentored.

Awards and honours 

 2016: Hamish Canham Prize
 2018: Highly commended in the Forward Prizes for Poetry
 2019: Portico Prize

References 

British poets
Year of birth missing (living people)
Living people